Decaisnina angustata is a species of flowering plant, an epiphytic hemiparasitic plant of the family Loranthaceae native to the Northern Territory, northern Western Australia, and northern Queensland. It was first described in 1983 as Decaisnina petiolata subsp. angustata by Bryan Alwyn Barlow who subsequently raised it to species status in 1993.

References

angustata
Flora of Western Australia
Parasitic plants
Epiphytes
Taxa named by Bryan Alwyn Barlow
Plants described in 1983